Yan Medeiros Sasse (born 24 June 1997), known as Yan Sasse, is a Brazilian professional footballer who plays as an attacking midfielder for Wellington Phoenix.

References

External links

1997 births
Living people
Footballers from Porto Alegre
Brazilian footballers
Association football midfielders
Campeonato Brasileiro Série A players
Campeonato Brasileiro Série B players
Coritiba Foot Ball Club players
CR Vasco da Gama players
América Futebol Clube (MG) players
Süper Lig players
Çaykur Rizespor footballers
Wellington Phoenix FC players
Brazilian expatriate footballers
Brazilian expatriate sportspeople in Turkey
Expatriate footballers in Turkey